Georgi Nadjakov (also spelled Georgi Nadzhakov) (26 December 1896 – 24 February 1981) was a  Bulgarian physicist. He became a corresponding member of the Göttingen Academy of Sciences (1940) in Germany, member of the Bulgarian Academy of Sciences (1945) and member of the Russian Academy of Sciences (1958).

Sofia University sent him to specialize in the laboratories of Paul Langevin and Marie Curie in Paris, where he investigated photoelectricity for one year.

Georgi Nadjakov experimentally investigated photoconducting properties of sulphur. He prepared the permanent photoelectret state of matter for the first time and published his paper in 1937
 and 1938. He called the electret discovered by Mototaro Eguchi in 1919, thermoelectret and the electret discovered by him in 1937, photoelectret.

Photoelectrets were the most notable achievement of Georgi Nadjakov. Its practical application led to the invention of the photocopier by Chester Carlson some years later.

Honours
Nadjakov Glacier on Graham Land in Antarctica is named after Georgi Nadjakov.
 Institute of Solid State Physics is since 1982 known as Georgi Nadjakov Institute of Solid State Physics. Its predecessor was founded by Georgi Nadjakov in 1946.

The study of Georgy Nadjakov is a Historic Site of the European Physical Society since 23 May 2014.

External links
 Academician George Stefanov Nadjakov, on the site of the Institute of Solid State Physics at the Bulgarian Academy of Sciences
 Institute of Solid State Physics

References

1896 births
1981 deaths
Members of the Bulgarian Academy of Sciences
Bulgarian physicists
People from Dupnitsa
Rectors of Sofia University
Burials at Central Sofia Cemetery